Kevin Tighe (b. Jon Kevin Fishburn; August 13, 1944) is an American actor who has worked in television, film, and theatre since the late 1960s. He attended University of Southern California where he earned a Master of Fine Arts in acting. Tighe earned a role in The Graduate starring Dustin Hoffman and then served in the U.S. Army. Following his military service, he returned to acting, working under contract for Paramount Pictures. In 1971 he signed a contract with Universal Studios and got the part of Fireman Roy DeSoto on the NBC series Emergency! (1972–77). He has made many guest appearances in TV shows such as Ellery Queen, Cos, and The Hardy Boys/Nancy Drew Mysteries. Tighe's film credits include Road House, What's Eating Gilbert Grape, and Jade. Tighe won a Genie Award for best supporting actor in 1994 for I Love a Man in Uniform. In the 2000s he played Anthony Cooper, the father of John Locke, on the ABC series Lost.

Filmography

Film

Television

References

Male actor filmographies
American filmographies